Ostra Luka may refer to:

 Oštra Luka, a municipality in Bosnia
 Ostrá Lúka, a village and municipality in southern Slovakia